Bide Arm is a community located on the Great Northern Peninsula in the Canadian province of Newfoundland and Labrador. It amalgamated with the former Town of Roddickton on January 1, 2009 to create the Town of Roddickton-Bide Arm.
Bide Arm had a population of 192 in the Canada 2006 Census.

See also 
 List of municipalities in Newfoundland and Labrador
 Roddickton, former town

References 

Former towns in Newfoundland and Labrador
Populated places in Newfoundland and Labrador